The Men's Junior South American Volleyball Championship is a sport competition for national volleyball teams with players under 21 years, currently held biannually and organized by the Confederación Sudamericana de Voleibol (CSV), the South American volleyball federation.

Results summary

Medals summary

See also

 Women's Junior South American Volleyball Championship
 Men's U23 South American Volleyball Championship
 Boys' Youth South American Volleyball Championship
 Boys' U17 South American Volleyball Championship

References
CSV

U20
U20
Recurring sporting events established in 1972
International volleyball competitions
International men's volleyball competitions
Youth volleyball
Biennial sporting events